USS Brilliant was a steamer purchased by the Union Navy during the American Civil War. She was used by the Union Navy as a gunboat assigned to patrol Confederate waterways.

Brilliant, a wooden stern-wheel steamer, was built in 1862 at Brownsville, Pennsylvania, and purchased by the War Department, August 13, 1862 at St. Louis, Missouri and converted to tinclad by Edward Hartt; transferred to the Navy with the Western Flotilla October 1, 1862; and commissioned the following day. Acting Volunteer Lieutenant Charles G. Perkins in command.

Assigned to the Mississippi Squadron 

After undergoing repairs Brilliant sailed from St. Louis, Missouri, September 25, 1862 to join the Mississippi Squadron at Cairo, Illinois. Throughout the Civil War she operated very actively on the Ohio, Cumberland, Tennessee, and Mississippi Rivers until August 2, 1865.

Assisting in driving off Confederate attackers of Fort Donelson 

On February 3, 1863 she assisted in repelling the Confederate attack on Fort Donelson, Tennessee, and from December 3 until December 16, 1864 supported the Union Army's attack on Nashville, Tennessee.

Post war decommissioning 

Brilliant was sold at public auction August 17, 1865 at Mound City, Illinois.

References 

Ships of the Union Navy
Steamships of the United States Navy
Gunboats of the United States Navy
American Civil War patrol vessels of the United States
Ships built in Brownsville, Pennsylvania
1862 ships